The Duat (Egyptological pronunciation "do-aht", also appearing as Tuat, Tuaut or Akert, Amenthes, Amenti, or Neter-khertet) is the underworld in ancient Egyptian mythology. It has been represented in hieroglyphs as a star-in-circle: 𓇽. The god Osiris was believed to be the lord of the underworld. He was the first mummy as depicted in the Osiris myth and he personified rebirth and life after death. The underworld was also the residence of various other gods along with Osiris.

The geography of the Duat is similar in outline to the world the Egyptians knew: There are realistic features like rivers, islands, fields, lakes, mounds and caverns, but there were also fantastic lakes of fire, walls of iron, and trees of turquoise. In the Book of Two Ways (a Coffin Text) there is even a map-like image of the Duat.

Resident souls, gods, and demons 
The Duat was also a residence for various gods, including Osiris, Anubis, Thoth, Horus, Hathor, and Maat, who all appear to the dead soul as it makes its way toward judgement. In spite of the many demon-like inhabitants of the Duat, it is not equivalent to the conceptions of Hell in the Abrahamic religions, in which souls are condemned with fiery torment. The absolute punishment for the wicked, in ancient Egyptian thought, was the denial of an afterlife to the deceased, ceasing to exist in the intellectual form (Ancient Egyptian: ꜣḫ; Egypt. Pron.: Akh). The grotesque spirits of the underworld were not evil, but rather acted as directed by the gods, to provide the various ordeals that the deceased had to face.

Underworld route of the sun 

The Duat was the region through which the sun god Ra traveled from west to east each night, and it was where he battled Apep, who embodied the primordial chaos which the sun had to defeat in order to rise each morning and bring order back to the earth. It was also the place where people's souls went after death for judgment, though that was not the full extent of the afterlife. Burial chambers formed touching-points between the mundane world and the Duat. As such, the west bank of the Nile was associated with the dead and funeral barges would mimic the sun god Ra's journey through the sky during the day. The Akh (the conscious part of the soul)  could use tombs to travel back and forth from the Duat.

Each night the sun god Ra travelled through the Duat, bringing revivification to the dead as their main benefit. When in the underworld he was in his ram-headed form. Ra travelled under the world upon his Atet barge from west to east; on the course of the underground journey, he was transformed from his aged Atum form into his young Khepri form – the new dawning sun. The role of the dead king, worshiped as a god, was also central to the mythology surrounding the concept of Duat, often depicted as being identical with Ra.

Along with the sun god the dead king travelled through the Duat, the Kingdom of Osiris, using the special knowledge he was supposed to possess, which was recorded in the Coffin Texts, that served as a guide to the hereafter not just for the king but for all deceased. According to the Amduat, the underworld consists of twelve regions signifying the twelve hours of the sun god's journey through it, battling Apep in order to bring order back to the earth in the morning; as his rays illuminated the Duat during the journey, they revived the dead who occupied the underworld and let them enjoy life after death during that hour of the night when they were in the presence of the sun god, after which they resumed their sleep, waiting for the god's return the following night.

Place of the dead 

The rest of the dead journeyed through the various parts of the Duat to be judged, but not to be unified with the sun god like the dead king. If the deceased was successfully able to pass various demons and challenges, then he or she would reach the Judgment of the dead. In this ritual, the deceased's first task was to correctly address each of the forty-two Assessors of Maat by name, while reciting the sins they did not commit during their lifetime. After confirming that they were sinless, the heart of the deceased was weighed by Anubis against the feather of Maat, which represents truth and justice. Any heart that is heavier than the feather failed the test, and was rejected and eaten by Ammit, the devourer of souls, as these people were denied existence after death in the Duat. The souls that were lighter than the feather would pass this most important test, and would be allowed to travel toward Aaru, the "Field of Rushes", an ideal version of the world they knew of, in which they would plough, sow, and harvest abundant crops.

Sources 
What is known of the Duat derives principally from funerary texts such as the Book of Gates, the Book of Caverns, the Coffin Texts, the Amduat, and the Book of the Dead. Each of these documents fulfilled a different purpose and give a different conception of the Duat, and different texts could be inconsistent with one another. Surviving texts differ in age and origin, and there likely was never a single uniform conception of the Duat, as is the case of many theological concepts in ancient Egypt.

The Book of the Dead and Coffin Texts were prepared as guidebooks through the Duats dangerous landscape and to a life as an ꜣḫ for people who had recently died. Emphasized in some of these texts are mounds and caverns, inhabited by gods, demons, or supernatural animals, which threatened the deceased along their journey. The purpose of the books is not to lay out a geography, but to describe a succession of rites of passage which the dead would have to pass to reach eternal life.

In popular culture
 The Duat appears as a major location in Rick Riordan's The Kane Chronicles series.
 The Duat reveals in The Crown of Ptolemy to have connections to the Mist from Riordan's Camp Half-Blood Chronicles series.
 The Duat appears as a secret level in the video game Spelunky 2.
 In Assassin's Creed Origins, the Duat is an important aspect of the game with the main character, Bayek, entering it multiple times.
 The Duat makes an appearance in the episode "Asylum" of the Disney+ series Moon Knight (2022) as the place where Marc Spector and his alter Steven Grant are being guided by the Egyptian goddess Taweret in the afterlife after being killed by Arthur Harrow.

See also
 Aaru
 Gate deities of the underworld
 Lake of fire

References

External links

 

Afterlife places

ca:Llista de personatges de la mitologia egípcia#D